KLM (Royal Dutch Airlines) Flight 844 was an international scheduled passenger flight from Biak-Mokmer Airport, Netherlands New Guinea (now Indonesia) to Manila International Airport, Manila, Philippines on 16 July 1957, which crashed into Cenderawasih Bay  from its departure airport. As a result, 58 (9 of which were crew members) out of 68 onboard perished. The flight was the first leg of a service with the ultimate destination of Amsterdam, the Netherlands.

The aircraft
The Lockheed 1049E Super Constellation was registered PH-LKT and christened Neutron. With a construction number of 4504, the aircraft first flew in 1953 and accumulated 11,867 hours of flight. After Flight 844, Neutron was written off.

Flight
After take-off at 03:32 on 16 July 1957 from Runway 10 at Biak-Mokmer Airport, the captain of KLM Flight 844 requested that the runway lights be kept on and permission to carry out a low pass down the runway, with both requests granted.

Investigation
Probable cause
Initially the crash was attributed to pilot error and/or technical failure, with no direct evidence for either cause. As the accident happened at night, the pilot might have misjudged his altitude relative to the sea.

The summary of the report from the Accident Board noted that there was no evidence of either pilot error or technical failure, but also noted that the risks involved in take-off and landing should not be needlessly increased by carrying out low passes on scheduled services with passengers aboard.

References

844
Aviation accidents and incidents in Indonesia
Aviation accidents and incidents in 1957
1957 in Indonesia
July 1957 events
Accidents and incidents involving the Lockheed Constellation
1957 disasters in Indonesia